Bentson is a surname. Notable people with the surname include:

 Kahukura Bentson (born 1978), New Zealand boxer
 Wayne Bentson, American businessman

See also
Bengtson
Benson (surname)
Bentzon